Robinson Creek is an unincorporated community located in Pike County, Kentucky, United States.

History
A post office called Robinson Creek has been in operation since 1848. The community took its name from nearby Robinson Creek.

Notable people
Reuben May, Wisconsin legislator, was born in Robinson Creek.

References

Unincorporated communities in Pike County, Kentucky
Unincorporated communities in Kentucky